HC Vladimir was an ice hockey team based in Vladimir, Russia. The team played in the Pervaya Liga, the then third level of Russian ice hockey and the Vtoraya Liga, the then fourth level of Russian ice hockey. They were founded in 2007 and folded in 2011 because of financial difficulties and disagreements with the Polaris Ice Palace.

External links
Official site

Ice hockey teams in Russia
Sport in Vladimir, Russia
2007 establishments in Russia
2011 disestablishments in Russia
Ice hockey clubs established in 2007
Ice hockey clubs disestablished in 2011